Beverly Hills refers to two railway stations in Beverly Hills, California. With the first constructed in 1896, they came to be served by the Pacific Electric and Southern Pacific railroads until the 1960s. The first station was demolished and replaced with a second across the street.

History

First station
The first station was built in 1896 as a stop on the Pasadena and Pacific Railroad. Initially called Morocco, it was located on the southeast corner of Santa Monica Boulevard and North Cañon Drive. Pacific Electric acquired the station as a result of the Great Merger of 1911 and began operating Red Cars here. The site was sold with the station demolished in 1930 to allow for construction of the Beverly Hills Post Office (later the Wallis Annenberg Center for the Performing Arts).

Second station
A new station was built across North Cañon Drive, on the southwest corner with Santa Monica Boulevard. The Spanish Baroque-style building was designed by Harry G. Koerner. All passenger service ended by September 1954, and the station building was removed in the 1960s. The final Southern Pacific freight train left Beverly Hills in 1986.

References

External links
 Beverly Hills Station 1943 at the Los Angeles Metro Transportation Research Library and Archive via Flickr

Pacific Electric stations
Railway stations in Los Angeles County, California
Railway stations in the United States opened in 1896
1996 establishments in California
Railway stations in the United States opened in 1930
Buildings and structures in Beverly Hills, California
Demolished railway stations in the United States